Fucking with F*** - Live is a live concert DVD and CD by German power metal band Edguy. It is the band's second live album since Burning Down the Opera in 2003 and their first ever concert DVD, which was recorded during their Rocket Ride Tour in 2006 in São Paulo, Brazil. The album was also released as a double CD album and a 2CD and DVD set.

The album title takes its name from the song "Fucking with Fire (Hair Force One)" from the band's 2006 album Rocket Ride.

Track list

Personnel 
Band members
Tobias Sammet - vocals
Jens Ludwig - guitar
Dirk Sauer - guitar
Tobias "Eggi" Exxel - bass
Felix Bohnke - drums

References

Edguy live albums
2009 video albums
Live video albums
2009 live albums
Nuclear Blast live albums
Nuclear Blast video albums
Edguy video albums